The 1969–70 Liga Española de Baloncesto season was the 14th season of the Liga Española de Baloncesto and was played between 1 November 1969 and 25 March 1970. The season ended with Real Madrid winning their 12th title.

Overview before the season
12 teams joined the league, including two promoted from the 1968–69 Segunda División.

Promoted from 1968–69 Segunda División
Español
Águilas Schweppes

Teams and locations
<onlyinclude>

Regular season

League table

Relegation playoffs

|}

Statistics leaders

Points

References

ACB.com  
Linguasport 

Liga Española de Baloncesto (1957–1983) seasons
    
Spanish